Jacques Rodolphe Edmund Landolt (17 May 1846 – 9 May 1926) was a Swiss ophthalmologist stationed in Paris, mostly known for a wide range of publications and his research in the field of ophthalmology.

First years 

Edmund Landolt was born in Kirchberg, Switzerland, of a French mother, Rosina Baumgartner, and Swiss father, Rudolf Landolt.

He came to France during the war in 1871 with a Swiss ambulance hospital, and 
was present at the battles around Belfort, where he contracted enteric fever.

Study and work 

Studied at University of Zurich where he got a Ph.D. in 1869 and was through this time and later pupil of
Knapp in Heidelberg, 
Ferdinand Arlt in Vienna, 
Von Graefe and Helmholtz in Berlin, 
Horner in Zürich, 
and 
Snellen and Donders in Utrecht.

Worked in physiological optics with, among others, Snellen and Donders.

After study and practice in Utrecht and Germany he established himself in Paris in 1874 where he
became oculist to the Institut National des Jeunes Aveugles.

With Panas (1832–1903) and Poncet (1849–1913) he re-founded the Archives d'ophtalmologie in 1881 and 
co-directed the Laboratoire d’Ophtalmologie with Javal.

Landolt's eye clinic on the Rue Saint-André-des-Arts was world-famous. There he treated, among others, Mary Cassatt, and gave her a diagnosis of cataracts.

Special fields of work 

Ocular muscles and their disorders.
Pioneering the work in their study and treatment.

He discovered “Landolt's bodies” between the rods and cones of the outer nuclear layer of the retina, investigated the functions of the ocular muscles and devised a new advancement operation.

Famous for his publication of Landolt C.

Publications

English 

 The introduction of the metrical system into ophthalmology, London : J. & A. Churchill, 1876. 
 The artificial eye, London : Trübner & Co., 1879. 
 tr. Edgar Athelstane Browne
 A manual of examination of the eyes. A course of lectures delivered at the "Ećole pratique,", Philadelphia, D. G. Brinton, 1879. 
 tr. Swan M Burnett
 A manual of examination of the eyes. A course of lectures delivered at the "École pratique,", Philadelphia, D. G. Brinton, 1879. 
 Ed. 2.: London : Baillie're, Tindall & Cox, 1879. 
 On myopia, London : Harrison and Sons, 1879. 
 On insufficiency of the power of convergence, [S.l. : [s.n.], 1886. 
 The refraction and accommodation of the eye and their anomalies, Edinburgh, Pentland, 1886. 
 Ed. 2.: Phila., J. B. Lippincott Company., 1886. 
 Refraction and accommodation of the eye and their anomalies, Edinburgh, Young J. Pentland, 1886. 
 Cataract-operation, in our time, [Chicago] : Ophthalmic Record, 1892. 
 Vade mecum of ophthalmological therapeutics, Philadelphia, J. B. Lippincott Company, 1898. 
 and Gygax
 On ophthalmic surgery, being the Bowman lecture delivered on Wednesday, June 7, 1911., Lond. 1911. 
 Defective ocular movements and their diagnosis, London, Frowde, 1913. 
 and Marc Landolt

French 

 Le grossissement des images ophthalmoscopiques, Paris : Adrien Delahaye, 1874. OCLC: 16077174
 Sur les causes de l'amétropie, Paris, 1877. OCLC: 79211659
 Leçons sur le diagnostic des maladies des yeux : faite à l'Ecole pratique de la Faculté de médicine de Paris, pendant le semester d'été 1875, Paris : Aux Bureaux du Progrès Médical : Ve A. Delahaye, 1877. OCLC: 16867948
 L'œil artificiel, Paris : Octave Doin, 1878. OCLC: 65009615
 Manuel d'ophthalmoscopie., Paris, Doin, 1878. OCLC: 14863824
 Clinique des maladies des yeux. Compte rendu pour l'anneé 1878, Coulommiers : P. Brodard, 1879. OCLC: 53178656
 Traité complet d'ophthalmologie, 	Paris : V. Adrien Delahaye, 1880-1889. OCLC: 9766547
 and Louis de Wecker.
 Ed. 2.: Paris, Lecrosnier et Babé, 1880-89. OCLC: 14860559
 Tableau synoptique des mouvements des yeux & de leurs anomalies, Paris : Martinet, [ca.1880] OCLC: 67734772
 Tableau synoptique des mouvements des yeux et de leurs anomalies, [S.l. : s.n., 188-?].  OCLC: 61653001
 aa. Librairie médicale scientifique vigot frères,
 Notice biographique à la mémoire du Docteur C [Johann] F[riedrich] Horner, professeur d'ophthalmologie à l'Université de Zurich, Paris : [s.n.], 1887. OCLC: 81850385
 and C Johann Friedrich Horner
 Notice biographique à la mémoire du Docteur T.F. Horner, professeur d'ophthalmologie à l'Université de Zurich, Paris, 1887. OCLC: 82939545
 Rapport sur la question du strabisme, preś. au VIIe Congreś international d'ophthalmologie à Heidelberg, Wiesbaden, 1888. OCLC: 67724682
 Opto-types simples. 2 circular disks, Paris : O. Doin, 1889. OCLC: 53178663
 F. C. Donders, Paris : Steinheil, 1889. OCLC: 69060626
 Un nouveau procédé d'opération dans le distichiasis, Paris, 1890. OCLC: 67724675
 Un nouveau cas d'achromatopsie totale, Paris : G. Steinheil, 1891. OCLC: 53178653
 H. de Helmholtz : esquisse biographique, 	[S.l. : s.n.], 1894. OCLC: 65101525
 and H. de Helmholtz
 Précis de thérapeutique ophtalmologique, Paris, Masson, 1895. OCLC: 14808861
 and Gygax
 Nouveaux objets-types pour la de\´{t}ermination de lacute visuelle, Paris : Doin, 1899. OCLC: 65087355
 Nouveau objets-types pour la détermination de l'acuité visuelle., Paris : O. Doin, 1899. OCLC: 53178619
 Souvenirs sur H.Snellen, Paris : Steinheil, 1908. OCLC: 67520817
 Diagnostic des troubles de la motilité oculaire, Paris, Masson, 1909. Ed. française par Marc Landolt OCLC: 14785955
 Examen des mouvements normaux & pathologiques des yeux, Paris, G. Steinheil, 1916. OCLC: 5856097

Family 
Married Valerie Hübscher. Two sons; Dr. Fernand Landolt, laryngologist and Dr. Marc Landolt, ophthalmologist.

Curiosity 
He is mentioned in Sherlock Holmes' book The Demon Device (Robert Saffron) p. 44. 

 

Sir Arthur Conan Doyle spent time with him in Paris in relation to his study in ophthalmology in Vienna.

References

External links

 College of Optometrists Historical Books pp. 120, 143, 192 and 208.

Stub 

1846 births
1926 deaths
Swiss ophthalmologists